After Midnight (also known as Naked After Midnight) is a 2014 American erotic mystery thriller film directed by Fred Olen Ray and starring Richard Grieco and Tawny Kitaen in her final film role.

Premise
After the murder of an exotic dancer at a strip club, her sister goes undercover to catch the killer. To get revenge, she must race against the clock and find the killer, as everyone is a suspect.

Cast
 Richard Grieco as Dr. Sam Hubbard
 Tawny Kitaen as Rikki
 Catherine Annette as Constance
 Tim Abell as John
 Jeneta St. Clair as Duffy / Ann
 Bobby Rice as Julian
 Tiffany Tynes as Misty
 Erika Jordan as Tina

References

External links

2014 films
Films directed by Fred Olen Ray
2010s mystery thriller films
American mystery thriller films
2010s English-language films
2010s American films